Lawrence Mark Sanger (born July 16, 1968) is an American Internet project developer and philosopher who co-founded the online encyclopedia Wikipedia along with Jimmy Wales. Sanger coined the name 'Wikipedia', and wrote much of Wikipedia's original governing policy, including "Neutral point of view" and "Ignore all rules." Sanger has worked on other online projects, including Nupedia, Encyclopedia of Earth, Citizendium, WatchKnowLearn, Reading Bear, Infobitt, Everipedia, the Knowledge Standards Foundation and the encyclosphere. He also advised blockchain company Phunware and the nonprofit online American political encyclopedia Ballotpedia. 

While studying at college, Sanger developed an interest in using the Internet for educational purposes and joined the online encyclopedia Nupedia as editor-in-chief in 2000. Disappointed with the slow progress of Nupedia, Sanger proposed using a wiki to solicit and receive articles to put through Nupedia's peer-review process; this change led to the development and launch of Wikipedia in 2001. Sanger served as Wikipedia's community leader and was the only editorial employee of Wikipedia in its early stages but was laid off and left the project in 2002. Sanger's status as a co-founder of Wikipedia has been questioned by fellow co-founder Jimmy Wales but is generally accepted. 

Since Sanger's departure from Wikipedia, he has been critical of the project, describing it in 2007 as being "broken beyond repair". He has argued that despite its merits, Wikipedia lacks credibility and accuracy due to a lack of respect for expertise and authority. Since 2020, he has criticized Wikipedia for what he perceives as a left-wing and liberal ideological bias in its articles.

In 2006, he founded Citizendium to compete with Wikipedia. In 2010, he stepped down as editor-in-chief. In 2020, he left Citizendium entirely. In 2017, he joined Everipedia as chief information officer (CTO). He resigned in 2019, to establish the Knowledge Standards Foundation and the encyclosphere. Sanger currently serves as the President and Executive Director of the Knowledge Standards Foundation.

Sanger's other interests include a focus on philosophy—in particular epistemology, early modern philosophy, and ethics. He taught philosophy at his alma mater Ohio State University.

Early life and education

Lawrence Mark Sanger was born in Bellevue, Washington, on July 16, 1968. His father Gerry was a marine biologist who studied seabirds and his mother raised the children. When he was seven years old, his family moved to Anchorage, Alaska, where he grew up. He was interested in philosophical topics at an early age and decided "to study philosophy and make it my life's work" at the age of 16.

In high school, he participated in debate, which Sanger says influenced his views on neutrality due to these debates exposing him to different issues and arguments from both sides":

Sanger graduated from high school in 1986 and attended Reed College, majoring in philosophy. In college he became interested in the Internet and its potential as a publishing outlet. Sanger set up a listserver as a medium for students and tutors to meet for tutoring and "to act as a forum for discussion of tutorials, tutorial methods, and the possibility and merits of a voluntary, free network of individual tutors and students finding each other via the Internet for education outside the traditional university setting". He started and moderated a libertarian philosophy discussion list, the Association for Systematic Philosophy. In 1994, Sanger wrote a manifesto for the discussion group:

Around 1994, Sanger met Jimmy Wales after subscribing to Wales' mailing list titled Moderated Discussion of Objectivist Philosophy (MDOP).

Sanger received a Bachelor of Arts degree in philosophy from Reed in 1991, a Master of Arts from Ohio State University in 1995, and a Doctor of Philosophy from Ohio State University in 2000. Beginning in 1998, he and a friend ran a website called "Sanger and Shannon's Review of Y2K News Reports", a resource for people such as managers of computer systems who were concerned about the year 2000 problem.

Nupedia and Wikipedia

Nupedia was a web-based encyclopedia whose articles were written by volunteer contributors possessing relevant subject matter expertise and reviewed by editors prior to publication, and were licensed as free content. It was conceived by Jimmy Wales and underwritten by his company Bomis. Wales had interacted with Sanger on mailing lists. In January 2000, Sanger had e-mailed Wales and others about a potential "cultural news blog" project that would cover social and political issues that he had in mind after January 1, 2000, had passed and rendered his Y2K site obsolete. Wales replied with "Instead of doing that, why don't you come and work on this idea that I've had?", presented the idea of Nupedia to Sanger, and invited him to join the project. Sanger was hired as Nupedia's editor-in-chief. He began to oversee Nupedia in February 2000, developing a review process for articles and recruiting editors. Through working on Nupedia, Sanger "found that it was a fascinating problem to organize people online to create encyclopedias." Articles were reviewed through Nupedia's e-mail system before being posted on the site. 

Nupedia made very slow progress and was at a standstill at the end of 2000, causing consternation to Sanger and Wales, with Sanger saying that "by the summer of 2000, it had become clear that the process we tested out [for making articles on Nupedia] was very slow." In January 2001, Sanger proposed the creation of a wiki to speed article development, which resulted in the launch of Wikipedia on January 15, 2001. Wikipedia was initially intended as a collaborative wiki for which the public would write entries that would then be fed into Nupedia's review process. However, the majority of Nupedia's experts and the Nupedia advisory board wanted little to do with the project, with members of the Nupedia advisory board mailing list dismissing the idea of Wikipedia as being ridiculous.

The idea of using a wiki came when Sanger met up with his friend Ben Kovitz for dinner on January 2, 2001, when Sanger was first introduced to wiki software. Kovitz, whom Sanger had known from philosophy mailing lists, was a computer programmer who had come across Ward Cunningham's Wiki. Sanger was impressed with the possibilities offered by wikis and called Wales, who agreed to try it. Sanger originated the name "Wikipedia", chosen from "a long list of names", which he later said was "a silly name for what was at first a very silly project".

Sanger created Wikipedia's first introductory pages and home pages, and invited the first few people to make contributions to the website, which was then called the Nupedia Wiki. Within a few days of its launch, Wikipedia had outgrown Nupedia and a small community of editors had gathered. Sanger served as Wikipedia's "chief organizer", running the project and formulating much of the original policy, including "Ignore all rules", "Neutral point of view", "No original research", and "Verifiability". He embraced Wikipedia's encouragement of boldness among its editors, telling users to "not worry about messing up". Sanger created the concept of "Brilliant prose", which evolved into featured articles as a way to showcase Wikipedia's highest-quality articles.

Sanger later grew disillusioned with Wikipedia, saying by mid-2001 its community was being "overrun" by "trolls" and "anarchist-types", who were "opposed to the idea that anyone should have any kind of authority that others do not". While such issues were not important to Sanger when Wikipedia was a source of articles for Nupedia, as it grew into an independent project he started to become more concerned about the community. Sanger became increasingly disillusioned and frustrated by a Wikipedia user known as "The Cunctator", who would troll Sanger. Sanger responded to these trends by proposing a stronger emphasis on expert editors and individuals with the authority to resolve disputes and enforce the rules. He also asked to be given more respect and deference by Wikipedians, which backfired and led to an increase in friction between him and the community.

Sanger was the only editorial employee of Wikipedia. In early 2002, Bomis, which had intended to make Wikipedia profitable from the outset, announced the possibility of placing advertisements on Wikipedia, in part to pay for Sanger's employment, but the project was opposed to any commercialization and the market for Internet advertising was small. Bomis made the decision to stop funding Sanger's job and he was laid off in February 2002 after the company lost a grant in the Dot-com crash and he resigned as editor-in-chief of Nupedia and chief organizer of Wikipedia on March 1. Sanger said he ended his participation in Wikipedia and Nupedia as a volunteer because he could not do justice to the tasks as a part-timer; he was also frustrated by sustained content battles and felt he lacked support from Wales. In a post to the Wikipedia community, Sanger said that his departure from Wikipedia might not be permanent if Bomis could monetize Wikipedia.

Sanger attempted to revive Nupedia throughout 2002 as its activity petered out. He tried to find an organization that would take control of it because it appeared Bomis would be unable to manage it and Wales seemed uninterested in it. Sanger later attempted to purchase the domain and other proprietary materials of Nupedia from Bomis. He said Nupedia was allowed to die a slow death and that its demise was not entirely due to the inherent inefficiencies in its review process. Nupedia's server crashed in September 2003 and the site was never relaunched.

Status as Wikipedia co-founder
Sanger's role in founding Wikipedia was the subject of edits by Wales to Wikipedia in 2005, which was followed by discussions within the community. Sanger accused Wales of "rewriting history" by disregarding his involvement; Wales told Wired he only clarified details about Sanger's contribution to the project and removed factual errors, and said he should not have done so. Wales later stated he had initially heard of the wiki concept from Bomis employee Jeremy Rosenfeld rather than Sanger.

On his personal website, Sanger posted several links that appear to support his role as a co-founder. As early as January 17, 2001, Sanger was cited as "Instigator of Nupedia's wiki" by its chief copyeditor Ruth Ifcher, and he was identified as a co-founder of Wikipedia by September 2001. Sanger has said he organized Wikipedia while Wales was mostly focused on Bomis.com.

Wales devised the idea of an open-source, collaborative encyclopedia that accepted contributions from anyone and invested in it while Sanger was in charge of organizing such an encyclopedia.

Criticism of Wikipedia
Since 2002, Sanger has been critical of Wikipedia and the Wikimedia Foundation. In 2015, Vice referred to Sanger as "Wikipedia's Most Outspoken Critic".

Accuracy, credibility and expertise
In December 2004, writing for the Kuro5hin website, Sanger commented that Wikipedia is not considered credible by librarians, teachers, and academics because it lacks a formal review process and that the presence of trolls and "difficult people" discourages accredited specialists and people who are knowledgeable from contributing to Wikipedia. He also argued that Wikipedia's "root problem" is a "lack of respect for expertise".

In April 2007, Sanger stated Wikipedia was "still quite useful and an amazing phenomenon" but he had "come to the view that it is also broken beyond repair" with a range of problems "from serious management problems, to an often dysfunctional community, to frequently unreliable content, and to a whole series of scandals".

In September 2009, Sanger said from early on the activities of trolls on the website "was a real problem, and Jimmy Wales absolutely refused to do anything about it". Sanger described Wales as a being a "fraud" and "liar" over the issue of who created Wikipedia. Wales responded to a query about the feud between the two men, stating: "I think very highly of Larry Sanger, and think that it is unfortunate that this silly debate has tended to overshadow his work."

In a November 2015 interview with Zachary Schwartz for Vice, Sanger expanded on his experiences with trolls on Wikipedia during the site's initial growth: "It was kind of stressful. I think it stressed out my wife more than me. The idea that there were people who were abusing me online just bothered her greatly." Sanger equated the trolls with modern-day social justice warriors (SJWs). When asked by Schwartz what he would do differently if he started over with Wikipedia, Sanger said: "One thing that I would have done, could have done, and should have done right away would be to create a process whereby articles were approved by experts." When asked what his thoughts were on Wikipedia in 2015, Sanger said: "I guess I'm moderately proud. I always sort of felt like we just got lucky with the right idea at the right time."

In a November 2016 interview with Alexandre Gilbert for The Times of Israel, Sanger said that Wikipedia has "a problem with fairness and sound governance".

Neutrality and ideological bias

In a July 2010 interview with Kathryn Schulz from Slate, Sanger said: "If you're talking about political biases, I actually think that that's one of Wikipedia's least-worst problems. It's really not as bad as the people at, say, Conservapedia seem to think. I do think that there is a liberal bias on most topics where such a bias is possible." Those individuals, according to Sanger, "who work the most on Wikipedia tend to be really comfortable with the most radically egalitarian views. And those people tend to be either liberals or libertarians." Sanger also argued that "I think the kind of biases that are in some ways more interesting and more pervasive have to do with individual biases not on political issues but on a host of very specific academic issues. An article can reflect the bias of a few people who just happen to be most motivated to work on it. This is a general problem with Wikipedia".

In March 2014, Sanger stated that "In some fields and some topics, there are groups who 'squat' on articles and insist on making them reflect their own specific biases. There is no credible mechanism to approve versions of articles."

In December 2015, Sanger said that "Wikipedia itself might be thought to be committed to such a completely international neutrality, and in places, its policies have seemed to hold it to that utopian ambition. But of course it cannot be and it is not. The English Wikipedia's articles about science most clearly betray its Western and especially Anglo-American provenance, and articles about, for example, philosophy are mostly about Western philosophy. I see nothing really wrong with that." Sanger also said that "My teenage ire at shamefully biased writers and editors found expression in Nupedia's neutrality policy, which in turn became Wikipedia's.", calling himself "a zealot for neutrality."

In December 2017, Sanger called Wikipedia's article on Intelligent design "appallingly biased".

In a May 2019 interview with Sophie Foggin of 150Sec, regarding the website's neutrality, Sanger said: "Wikipedia has long since decided to turn the other cheek when influential editors make articles speak with one point of view, when they dismiss unpopular views, or when they utterly fail to do justice to alternative approaches to a topic." Sanger also stated that Wikipedia "never did come up with a good solution" for "how to rein in the bad actors so that they did not ruin the project for everyone else" and that "Wikipedia is a broken system as a result".

In a blog post in May 2020, Sanger described Wikipedia as "badly biased" and as favoring left-wing and liberal politics. In his opinion, portions of the Donald Trump Wikipedia article are "unrelentingly negative", while the Barack Obama article "completely fails to mention many well-known scandals". He listed other topics he argued are presented with a liberal and left-wing bias, including the topics on Hillary Clinton, abortion, drug legalization, religion, and LGBT adoption. In particular, Sanger said that Wikipedia, in describing many of Trump's statements as "false", established the website's biases. Sanger commented in the blog post: "It is time for Wikipedia to come clean and admit that it has abandoned NPOV (i.e., neutrality as a policy)." Regarding Wikipedia's current neutrality policy, Sanger said that "it endorses the utterly bankrupt canard of journalistic 'false balance', which is directly contradictory to the original neutrality policy. As a result, even as journalists turn to opinion and activism, Wikipedia now touts controversial points of view on politics, religion, and science".

In a February 2021 interview with Fox News, Sanger stated that Wikipedia's "ideological and religious bias is real and troubling, particularly in a resource that continues to be treated by many as an unbiased reference work". In a February 2021 interview with Carrie Sheffield on Pluto TV, Sanger criticized Wikipedia's coverage of socialism, saying that "when schoolkids go, and they look up answers to questions about the meaning of 'socialism' ... they're going to find an explanation that completely ignores any conservative, libertarian, or critical treatment of the subject", "And that's really problematic. That's not education. That's propaganda." He claimed that Wikipedia was originally "committed to neutrality" until "about 10 years ago" when "liberals or leftists made their march through the institutions ... and basically took [Wikipedia] over", adding that "They started getting rid of citations from conservative sources, even conservative sources that were cited in order to explain the conservative point of view. At least in some cases, that was the case, and more and more, certain points of view were castigated and labeled". When asked about Wikipedia's reaction to his criticism, Sanger said that "They ignore me" and that "They don't care what I say, and the feeling is mutual."

In a July 2021 interview with Freddie Sayers of LockdownTV, Sanger claimed that Wikipedia is not trustworthy and that its contributors have a left-leaning bias. According to Sanger, Wikipedia's coverage of U.S. President Joe Biden contained "very little by way of the concerns that Republicans have had about him" or the Ukraine allegations. He further adds that since Wikipedia encourages the use of secondary sources instead of primary sources, Wikipedia's content is heavily influenced by coverage from center-left-wing media outlets, saying that "You can't cite the Daily Mail at all. You can't cite Fox News on socio-political issues either. It's banned. So what does that mean? It means that if a controversy does not appear in the mainstream center-Left media, then it's not going to appear on Wikipedia." Despite having a neutrality policy, he says that the viewpoint of Wikipedia articles represent the consensus viewpoints and that users are prohibited from adding counter-arguments to established views, which would help create more neutral articles. He claimed that Wikipedia can give a "reliably establishment point of view on pretty much everything" and that "if only one version of the facts is allowed then that gives a huge incentive to wealthy and powerful people to seize control of things like Wikipedia in order to shore up their power. And they do that."

In a July 22, 2021, interview with Tucker Carlson on Fox News, Sanger said that Wikipedia allowing anonymous contributors had resulted in the website being taken over by criminal bodies, as well as by corporations and governments. Sanger also said that "I don't know that there is a way to fix Wikipedia within Wikipedia. It's an institutionally conservative place".

In an August 2021 interview with The Sunday Times of London, Sanger objected to Wikipedia's description of alternative medicines, such as homeopathy, as "pseudoscience". He believed such a definition lacked true neutrality. Sanger also claimed that "If you don't kowtow to the right people, you won't even be allowed to participate." Of Wikipedia as a whole, he said: "I advise against using it, even to conscientious students." Of Jimmy Wales' role in Wikipedia, Sanger said that: "[There was] this kind of idealism that Jimmy Wales had ... that if you just open up the encyclopaedia to anybody, then because people are generally good, they will do the right thing. I think perhaps he still has that view. But frankly, that really wasn't ever my view. I was always a bit worried about what might happen if ideologues took over as naturally they would want to if it was at all successful. I think that actually is what happened." According to The Sunday Times, Wikipedia denied accusations from Sanger of having a particular political bias, with a spokesperson for the encyclopedia saying that third-party studies have shown that its editors come from a variety of ideological viewpoints and that "As more people engage in the editing process on Wikipedia, the more neutral articles tend to become".

In a March 2022 interview with Fox Nation, Sanger once more said that Wikipedia had abandoned its neutrality policy and that "the kinds of people that are allowed to have any influence on Wikipedia have been narrowed down greatly to essentially people who agree with the establishment left." In his opinion: "The left, frankly, is relentless when it comes to stating their point of view and using the organs of mass media—and Wikipedia is part of their mass media I think—to shape the world", "And so it became another one of the institutions that they had to capture." Sanger also claimed that Wikipedia originally had a strong commitment to neutrality, saying: "We promulgated a policy, the neutrality policy. And it was very clear in the beginning. And I think I really hammered it a lot. In the two years that I was with the organization, I really drove that neutrality policy. And I articulated a defense."

Claims of pornographic content
In April 2010, Sanger sent a letter to the Federal Bureau of Investigation (FBI) about his concern that Wikimedia Commons was hosting child pornography and later clarified the object of his concern was "obscene visual representations of the abuse of children" and not photographs. Sanger said he felt it was his "civic duty" to report the images. Critics accused Sanger of having an ulterior motive for reporting the images, noting he was still in charge of the faltering Citizendium project and said that publicizing the accusations was unnecessary. In 2012, Sanger told Fox News that he worked with NetSpark to get them to donate or heavily discount its pornographic image filtering technology for use on Wikipedia. NetSpark attempted to contact the Wikimedia Foundation in 2012 but received no response.

In a June 2012 interview with TechCrunch TV, Sanger criticized Wikipedia for containing too much pornography that children could access and said that he did not regret leaving Wikipedia.

Later activities

Citizendium

At the Wizards of OS conference in September 2006, Sanger announced the launch of a new wiki-based encyclopedia called Citizendium—short for "citizens' compendium"—as a fork of Wikipedia. The objective of the fork was to address perceived flaws in the way Wikipedia functions; anonymous editing was disallowed, all users were required to use their real names, and there was a layer of experts who had extra authority. It was an attempt by Sanger to establish a credible online encyclopedia based on scholarship, aiming to bring more accountability and academic rigor to articles. The site attempted to implement an expert review process and experts tried to reach a decision in disputes that could not be resolved by consensus.

Sanger predicted a rapid increase in Citizendium's traffic at its first anniversary in 2007. After a burst of initial work, however, the site went into decline and most of the experts were not retained. In 2011, Ars Technica reporter Timothy B. Lee said Citizendium was "dead in the water". Lee noted that Citizendium's late start was a disadvantage and that its growth was hindered by an "unwieldy editing model". In 2014, the number of Citizendium contributors was under 100 and the number of edits per day was about "a dozen or so" according to Winthrop University's Dean of Library Services. By August 2016, Citizendium had about 17,000 articles, 160 of which had undergone expert review.

Sanger, who in early 2007 announced he did not intend to head Citizendium indefinitely, effectively ceased to edit it in early 2009, although an announcement confirming this was not made until July 30, 2009, on the Citizendium-l mailing list. He stepped down as editor-in-chief of Citizendium on September 22, 2010, but said he would continue to support the project. 

On July 2, 2020, Sanger wrote that he had transferred legal ownership of the Citizendium domain name to Pat Palmer, saying that Citizendium had "stopped being 'my' project a long time ago. But until this morning, I still owned the domain name."

On Citizendium, Sanger refused to recognize women's studies as a top-level category, calling it too "politically correct." Sanger later said that "it wasn't about women's studies in particular", but about "too much overlap with existing groups."

Other projects
Larry Sanger has been involved with several other online encyclopedia projects. In 2005, he joined the Digital Universe Foundation as Director of Distributed Content Programs. He was a key organizer of the Digital Universe Encyclopedia web project that was launched in early 2006. The Digital Universe encyclopedia recruited recognized experts to write articles and to check user-submitted articles for accuracy. The first part of the project was the expert-written-and-edited Encyclopedia of Earth. Sanger later felt the pace of content production at the Foundation was too slow for him; he proposed open content to help speed development but the proposal was rejected.

Sanger has worked at the WatchKnowLearn project, a non-profit organization that focuses on educating young children using videos and other media on the web. It is funded by grants, philanthropists, and the Community Foundation of Northwest Mississippi. Sanger headed the development of WatchKnowLearn from 2008 to 2010. It consists of a repository of educational videos for kindergarten to the 12th grade. In February 2013, it ranked as the top search result among educational videos on Google's search engine and attracted over six million page views each month. In 2010 and 2011, he continued developing a web-based reading-tutorial application for beginning readers, which was launched as Reading Bear in 2012. It uses the principles of phonics and multimedia presentations such as videos, PowerPoint presentations, and ebooks to teach pronunciation to children. It also aims to teach the meaning and context of each word.

In February 2013, Sanger announced a project a crowdsourced news portal called Infobitt; saying on Twitter, "My new project will show the world how to crowdsource high-quality content—a problem I've long wanted to solve. Not a wiki." The site, which aimed to be a crowdsourced news aggregator, went online in December 2014 but ran out of money in July 2015. 

In December 2017, it was announced that Sanger had become the chief information officer of Everipedia, an open encyclopedia that uses blockchain technology. That month, Sanger told Inverse that Everipedia is "going to change the world in a dramatic way, more than Wikipedia did". That same month, Sanger told TechRepublic that "Everipedia is the encyclopedia of everything, where topics are unrestricted, unlike on Wikipedia." 

On July 1, 2019, Sanger advocated for a social-media strike to take place on July 4 and 5 to demand the decentralization of social media platforms to their user bases from their top-level management so their users can assert control over their data and privacy.

On October 18, 2019, Sanger announced that he had resigned from his position at Everipedia and returned his stock holdings in the company without compensation to establish the Knowledge Standards Foundation and develop the website encyclosphere.org. He said of the venture, "We need to do for encyclopedias what blogging standards did for blogs: there needs to be an 'Encyclosphere'. We should build a totally decentralized network, like the Blogosphere—or like email, IRC, blockchains, and the World Wide Web itself." The Knowledge Standards Foundation was founded in September 2019 by Sanger and others. 

In 2020, Sanger served on the advisory board of blockchain company Phunware.

Philosophy
Larry Sanger has a doctorate in Philosophy from Ohio State University. His professional interests are epistemology, early modern philosophy, and ethics. Most of Sanger's philosophical work focuses on epistemology. In 2008, he visited Balliol College of the University of Oxford to debate the proposal "the Internet is the future of knowledge", arguing wikis and blogs are changing the way knowledge is created and distributed. Sanger has frequently written and spoken about collaborative content.

In January 2002, Sanger returned to Columbus, Ohio to teach philosophy at Ohio State University, where he taught the subject until June 2005.

In December 2010, Sanger said he considered WikiLeaks to be "enemies of the U.S.—not just the government, but the people".

In September 2021, in response to U.S. President Joe Biden announcing a COVID-19 vaccine mandate, Sanger tweeted "Nor I.#IWillNotComply" in agreement with political commentator Tim Pool. In an earlier tweet, Sanger falsely claimed that COVID-19 vaccines are "not a vaccine".

In March 2022, Sanger said that "Decentralization is a necessary but not sufficient condition of internet freedom", arguing that both federated and peer-to-peer decentralized networks "can still be captured and controlled in various ways and rendered un-free."

Sanger has argued that liberal and left-leaning views dominate in academia, science, the media and tech companies such as Facebook and Twitter.

Personal life
In February 2000, when Sanger was hired by Wales to develop Nupedia, he moved to San Diego. He was married in Las Vegas in December 2001. In 2005, he and his wife moved to Santa Cruz, California, to work for Digital Universe. As of 2015, Sanger lives in the outskirts of Columbus, Ohio. As of 2021, he lives with his wife and two sons, who are both homeschooled.

Sanger was raised as a Lutheran and went to a Sunday school, but became an agnostic when he was 16 after his family stopped regularly going to church. Ethnically, Sanger described himself in 2016 as "a typical American cross-breed (lots of English, German, and French)".

Sanger supports the concept of "baby reading". He started teaching his son to read before his second birthday and posted videos online to demonstrate this. Sanger is known for his love of Irish traditional music.

Selected writings
 Academic work
 Epistemic Circularity: An Essay on the Problem of Meta-Justification – doctoral thesis.
 Descartes's methods and their theoretical background – bachelor thesis.

 Essays
 Why Neutrality?. Ballotpedia, December 2015.
 How and Why I Taught My Toddler to Read (PDF). LarrySanger.org, December 2010.
 Individual Knowledge in the Internet Age. Educause Review, April 2010.
 The Fate of Expertise after Wikipedia (PDF). Episteme – Edinburgh University Press, February 2009.
 Who Says We Know: On The New Politics of Knowledge. Edge Foundation – Edge Reality Club, April 2007.
 Humanity's Coming Enlightenment. (Archived) Edge Foundation – World Question Center, 2007.

 Presentations
 What Strong Collaboration Means for Scholarly Publishing. Keynote at the Annual Meeting of Society for Scholarly Publishing, San Francisco, CA, June 7, 2007.
 How to Think about Strong Collaboration among Professionals. Keynote at the Handelsblatt IT Congress, Bonn, Germany, January 30, 2007.
 Why Make Room for Experts in Web 2.0?. Opening keynote at the SVForum, The Business of New Media, Santa Clara, CA, October 25, 2006.
Books
 Essays on Free Knowledge: The Origins of Wikipedia and the New Politics of Knowledge. September 8, 2020

See also
 List of Wikipedia people

References

Bibliography

External links

 Larry Sanger – Sanger's personal website.
 Encyclosphere
 
 
  – An essay discussing the origins of Wikipedia.

1968 births
Living people
American bloggers
American computer businesspeople
American educational theorists
American founders
Philosophers from Ohio
Philosophers from Washington (state)
Philosophers from California
Philosophers from Alaska
Critics of Wikipedia
Epistemologists
Ohio State University alumni
Businesspeople from Anchorage, Alaska
People from Bellevue, Washington
People from San Diego
People from Columbus, Ohio
Reed College alumni
21st-century American non-fiction writers
Wikipedia people
Former Lutherans
American agnostics